Johan Kriek was the defending champion, but lost in the semifinals this year.

Brad Gilbert won the title, defeating Brian Teacher 4–6, 7–5, 6–0 in the final.

Seeds

  Johan Kriek (semifinals)
  Brad Gilbert (champion)
  Sammy Giammalva Jr. (quarterfinals)
  John Lloyd (second round)
  Paul Annacone (quarterfinals)
 N/A
  Bob Green (quarterfinals)
  Marc Flur (first round)

Draw

Finals

Top half

Bottom half

External links
 Main draw

1985 Livingston Open
1985 Grand Prix (tennis)